Matt Chandler (born 1972) is an American author of more than 70 books for young children, including Side-by-Side Baseball Stars: Comparing the Game's Greatest Players, which was selected by the American Society of Journalists and Authors as its 2015 Children's/Young Adult Book of the Year.

Books

Chandler has published 60+ children's books, working primarily with Capstone Publishers, as well as with Cherry Lake Publishing, Callisto Media and Sports Illustrated Kids.

Ghosts and Haunted Titles
Alcatraz (a "You Choose" Adventure)
The World's Most Haunted Places
Ghosts of the Alamo and Other Hauntings of the South
Bachelor's Grove Cemetery and Other Haunted Places of the Midwest
Famous Ghost Stories of North America
Famous Ghost Stories of Europe
 Ghosts of the OK Corral and Other Hauntings of Tombstone Arizona
 The Alamo's Ghosts and Other Hauntings of San Antonio Texas
Sports Titles 
Patrick Mahomes: Football MVP
Kevin Durant: Basketball Champion
Alex Morgan: Soccer Champion
Chloe Kim: Gold Medal Snowboarder
Giannis Antetokounmpo: Basketball Powerhouse
Khalil Mack: Football Dominator
 Adam Thielen: Football's Underdog Star
 Klay Thompson: Basketball Sharpshooter
 Megan Rapinoe: World Cup Champion
 Aly Raisman: Gold Medal Gymnast
 Mike Trout: Baseball MVP
 Coco Gauff: Tennis Champion
 Nyjah Huston: Skateboard Superstar
Fernando Tatis Jr.: Big-Time Hitter
Sabrina Ionescu: Rising Basketball Star
 Declan Farmer: Paralympic Hockey Star
 Chad Kerley: BMX's Breakout Star
 Zion Williamson: Basketball's Rising Star
Christian Yelich: Baseball MVP
James Harden: Basketball Sharpshooter
Luka Doncic: Basketball's Breakout Star
Breanna Stewart: Pro Basketball MVP
Lamar Jackson: Superstar Quarterback
Wacky Baseball Trivia
Wacky Basketball Trivia
Pro Baseball Records: A Guide for Every Fan
Pro Basketball Records: A Guide for Every Fan
The Science of Basketball
The Science of Baseball
The Science of Hockey
Side by Side Baseball Stars: Comparing the Game's Greatest Players
Who's Who of Pro Baseball: A Guide to the Game's Greatest Players
Outrageous Pro Wrestling Rivalries
Deer Hunting for Kids
Bear Hunting for Kids
Tae Kwon Do: A Guide for Athletes and Fans
Gymnastics: A Guide for Athletes and Fans
Football: A Guide for Players and Fans
Boy's Lacrosse: A Guide for Players and Fans
On the Court: Biographies of Today's Best Basketball Players
Baseball's Greatest Walk-Offs and Other Crunch Time Heroics
Soccer's Greatest Last Second Shots and Other Crunch Time Heroics
Football's Greatest Hail Mary Passes and Other Crunch Time Heroics

Graphic Novel Titles
Behind Enemy Lines: The Escape of Robert Grimes with the Comet Line
Outrunning the Nazis: The Brave Escape of Resistance Fighter Sven Somme
The Trojan War
Ninjas: Japan's Stealthy Secret Agents

Health Titles (Cherry Lake Publishing)

 Understanding Mental Health
 Understanding Suicide
 Understanding Obesity
 Understanding Tobacco

Other Titles
Military Drones
Recreational Drones
Dangerous Times: History's Most Troubled Eras
Balloons for Heaven
The Adventures of Larry the Lunchbox Lizard: First Time With a Babysitter
The Tech Behind Off-Road Vehicles
The Tech Behind Electric Cars
The Tech Behind Concept Cars
The Tech Behind Self-Driving Cars
Daring Escape from Alcatraz

Magazine writing
Chandler has written for a number of regional and national magazines including SuperLawyers, American Legion Magazine, Gentry, Buffalo Magazine, and Buffalo Spree. 
 Cover story on attorney James Harrington, Super Lawyers Magazine, August 2016
 Cover story on attorney Ginger Schroder, Super Lawyers Magazine, August 2015
 "Tin Can Soldiers", American Legion Magazine

Essays
His essays have appeared in four books within the internationally best-selling series Chicken Soup for the Soul, including:
 "Chicken Soup for the Soul: Think Positive"
 "Chicken Soup for the Soul: Hooked on Hockey"
 "Chicken Soup for the Soul: Time to Thrive"
 "Chicken Soup for the Soul: Think Positive, Live Happy"

Author visits to elementary schools
In addition to his writing, Chandler visits elementary schools to present "author visits". His presentations are designed to inspire children and encourage reading, while being fun and entertaining. In a 2016 interview with the West Seneca Bee, Chandler had this to say about his school visits: "I took a very unconventional path to becoming a writer and overcame long odds, so I really try to reach them (the students) and show them they can follow their dreams and achieve anything if they are willing to work hard and never give up."

Awards

Chandler is a six-time New York Press Association Award winner, having earned recognition for his columns and feature writing while a newspaper reporter for Buffalo Business First, the Buffalo Law Journal, and The Hamburg Sun.

He was also recognized by the American Society of Journalists and Authors with its 2015 award for Best Children's/Young Adult book for his Capstone Press/Sports Illustrated Kids book, Side by Side Baseball Stars: Comparing the Game's Greatest Players.

References

External links

 Official website

1972 births
Living people
People from Dover, New Hampshire
Writers from Ithaca, New York